Muzz (formerly Muzmatch) is a Muslim dating app founded by Shahzad Younas and launched in 2015. Its tagline is "Where Single Muslims Meet" and "Where Muslims meet" and emphasises marriage as opposed to casual dating. The app is available in 14 languages.Muzz LTD is based in Ilford, London.

History 
Muzmatch was first launched as a matrimonial website platform in 2011 by Shahzad Younas. The site employed a pay-as-you-go mechanism for its members. It allowed complete anonymity to all of its members – with all profile pictures being initially blurred, allowing only those "seriously" looking to find a bride or groom to pay a small amount to access a full detailed profile description and picture.

In 2014, Younas quit his 9-year banking career at Morgan Stanley and taught himself how to code, investing all of his savings in starting up the business. He built the initial app himself, having been unimpressed with the quality of existing Muslim dating websites, which he describes as "ugly and horrible", and having a "terrible reputation".

The website platform was shut down, with the app having a soft launch in 2015. The app is available in 14 languages.

In the summer of 2017, Muzmatch was accepted into Silicon Valley-based accelerator Y Combinator, becoming the first Muslim-centric startup to do so. Younas opened his address to the room by saying: "Muslims don't date, we marry."

In 2017, Muzmatch raised a total of $1.75M in their initial seed round, led by Fabrice Grinda's FJ Labs, Y Combinator, and London-based venture firm, Hambro Perks. Muzmatch reported having 200,000 members spread across 160 countries, and over 6000 couples who met on the platform.

In April 2019 Muzmatch was shortlisted for "App of the Year" at the Evening Standard Business Awards. It was also a 2019 London and the South finalist at The Spectator Business awards. In July 2019 Muzmatch raised $7M in their Series A round of funding, and reported having over 1.5 million users of its app and over 30,000 successes. The funding was jointly led by U.S. hedge fund Luxor Capital and Y Combinator.

In July 2020, Muzmatch welcomed its three millionth user. The company claims it took four years to get to one million members and another year to reach two million.

The Match Group took Muzmatch to court in February of 2021 alleging that the inclusion of the word "match" allowed the app to unfairly benefit from the reputation of popular dating site  Match.com. This was reportedly after a series of attempts by the Match Group to purchase Muzmatch for as much as $35 million in 2019. In April 2022, London courts sided with the Match Group.

Rebrand to Muzz 
Following the ruling in the Match Group's favour at the UK IPEC Court, Muzmatch rebranded to Muzz and launched a revamped app in May 2022.

Operation 
Members sign up to the app and complete their profile, where they are asked to complete their profile with photos and information such as sect, ethnicity and other religious information. Members can use the app for free, or choose to upgrade to premium membership extra features, such as unlimited profiles, more advanced search filters and preferences, and being at the front of the queue.

Muzz was the first Muslim app to allow members to include a chaperone or Wali who would be able to monitor messages sent to and from their account. Users can also ensure they have no profile picture on their account or details such as their full name, so they can be as private online as possible.

In 2016, the platform introduced selfie verification to ensure everyone on the app is verified. The company has a team in Bangladesh which, alongside its HQ in Aldgate, manually moderates every profile.

In 2020, during the COVID-19 pandemic, Muzz became the first leading religious dating platform to release a free in-app video calling feature following a survey which found that 83% of users said they were struggling to find serious relationships because of lockdowns in their area.

In 2022, following the rebrand and launch of the Muzz app, the app introduced Video and Voice profiles - a first in the Muslim space.

Marketing 
The company ran a viral tongue-in-cheek marketing campaign across the London Underground tube network and the Manchester and Birmingham bus network. The ads incorporated halal-inspired puns such as "Halal, is it me you're looking for?".

In 2019, the company launched a Brexit-themed marketing campaign on the London Underground. Ads with the message "Time to Leave the Single Market?" ran just as the UK population began to consider its options ahead of a December general election.

In Jan 2022, Muzz, in collaboration with a British single Muslim, launched a billboard campaign to "Find Malik a wife", which ran across London, Birmingham and Manchester.  The campaign went viral, being covered across hundreds of news outlets and television programmes.  Malik himself communicated with a number of singles who reached out to him via the website. Over 5000 people completed the application form. The reveal stage showed the link between Malik and Muzz, with the humorous tagline "We'll say we met at the mosque".

References

Online dating applications